is an actress, born 24 October 1952 in Ise, Mie Prefecture, Japan. She started her career in the 1977 movie Karate for Life. One of her television roles was as Osono, a ninja in the jidaigeki series Yoshimune Hyōbanki: Abarenbō Shōgun. She also regularly appeared in Abare Hasshū Goyō Tabi.

Filmography

Film
Karate for Life (1977) – Reiko
New Female Convict Scorpion Special: Block X (1977) – Nami Matsushima
The Fall of Ako Castle (1978) – Osen
Family (2001)
Family 2 (2001)
Hakodate Coffee (2016)

Television
Shiroi Kyotō (1978) – Kanako
Abarenbō Shōgun III (1990) – Osono
Abare Hasshū Goyō Tabi (season1-3)
Massan (2014) – Kayo Tanaka

Awards

References

External links
 
  Official site
 

1952 births
Living people
Japanese actresses
People from Ise, Mie